René-Jean Jacquet (27 June 1933 – 21 July 1993) was a French football goalkeeper.

Club career
Girondins de Bordeaux (1954)
Stade de Reims (1955–1961)
Lille Olympique SC (1961–1962)

References

 A tribute

1933 births
1993 deaths
French footballers
Association football goalkeepers
Ligue 1 players
FC Girondins de Bordeaux players
Stade de Reims players
Lille OSC players